Brett Grant Vroman (born December 25, 1955) is an American former professional basketball player. A 7'0" 220 lb center, he played college basketball at the University of California, Los Angeles (UCLA) and at the University of Nevada, Las Vegas (UNLV). His professional career included a brief stint with the NBA's Utah Jazz and 12 years playing in Europe.

Vroman was selected by the Philadelphia 76ers with the 21st pick in the fourth round of the 1978 NBA Draft but never made the team.  On July 27, 1980 he signed as a free agent with the Utah Jazz for whom he played 11 games in 1980-81, averaging 3.1 points, 2.3 rebounds and 0.8 assist per game.
After ending his NBA career, he played in Europe, mostly in Italy.

He is the father of the late Jackson Vroman, who was selected by the Chicago Bulls in the 2004 NBA draft and played with the Phoenix Suns and the New Orleans Hornets / New Orleans/Oklahoma City Hornets from 2004 to 2006.

Notes

External links
NBA stats @ basketballreference.com

1955 births
Living people
American expatriate basketball people in Finland
American expatriate basketball people in Greece
American expatriate basketball people in Italy
American men's basketball players
Aris B.C. players
Basket Mestre 1958 players
Basket Napoli players
Basketball players from Los Angeles
Billings Volcanos players
Centers (basketball)
Greek Basket League players
Hawaii Volcanos players
Mens Sana Basket players
Nuova Pallacanestro Gorizia players
Parade High School All-Americans (boys' basketball)
People from Hollywood, Los Angeles
Philadelphia 76ers draft picks
Torpan Pojat players
UCLA Bruins men's basketball players
UNLV Runnin' Rebels basketball players
Utah Jazz players
Sportspeople from Provo, Utah
Basketball players from Utah